Instituto Sacatar is a Brazilian non-profit arts foundation based in Salvador, Bahia, Brazil, which sponsors artistic fellowships/residencies for creative individuals of all disciplines, ages and nationalities.   

Based at an estate on the Island of Itaparica in the Baía de Todos os Santos, across from the city of Salvador, Brazil, the purpose of the Instituto Sacatar is to provide artists with a place to live and create, generate opportunities for artists to interact and collaborate with the local and regional communities in Bahia, and to enhance the visibility and cultural impact of Salvador, Bahia and the nation of Brazil.  Over four hundred artists from sixty-seven countries have participated since the first Fellows arrived in September 2001. Most of the participating artists spend eight weeks in residence, with studio, local logistical support, room and board provided by the Instituto.  The Sacatar Foundation, a California non-profit corporation, provides the primary financial support of the Instituto Sacatar.   

In addition to its own program, the Instituto Sacatar awards specific Fellowships in conjunction with international partners.  In 2019, the partner organizations include Pro Helvetia (Switzerland), Africa Centre (South Africa), Djerassi Resident Artists Program (United States), Les Ateliers des Artistes en Exil (France), Video Brasil and the Fundação Cultural do Estado da Bahia.

External links
 Instituto Sacatar
 Sacatar at Res Artis
 UNESCO ASCHBERG program at Sacatar
 Trans Artists Information on International Artist in Residence Programs

Instituto Sacatar
Instituto Sacatar
Instituto Sacatar
Instituto Sacatar